Couto de Esteves is a freguesia in Sever do Vouga, Aveiro District, Portugal. The population in 2011 was 890, in an area of 16.42 km2. The Dólmen da Arca da Cerqueira is located in the freguesia.

References

Freguesias of Sever do Vouga